Tanya Davis is an American artist (born in Florida) predominantly known for her hyper-realistic representational watercolors which are often on the subject of reflections and transparency. She is a past President of the Torpedo Factory Artists' Association, one of the largest artists associations in the US.  In 1999 she was selected as the Torpedo Factory Artist of the Year.

Education 
Davis received a Bachelor of Arts: Studio Art, magna cum laude, from Florida State University in 1981, and has been a professional artist since 1990.

Career 
Davis is a Signature Member of the National Watercolor Society and the Baltimore Watercolor Society, as well as a Member of the Florida Watercolor Society and the Florida Suncoast Watercolor Society. Her artwork has been recognized for multiple awards including  the Holbein Artist Materials Award of Excellence, the Escoda Award of Excellence, and the 2002 Art & Antiques Magazine Award of Excellence.

Solo shows and selected group shows 
1997 - University of Maryland University College, MD

1998 - Northern Virginia Community College, Woodbridge, VA

1999 - The Art League, Alexandria, VA

2000 - Target Gallery, Alexandria, VA

2000 - Spectrum Gallery, Washington, DC
2001 - "Contemporary Realism: A Survey of Washington Area Artists." The Athenaeum, Alexandria, VA

2008 - "Trading Spaces." ArtSpace, Raleigh, NC

2015 - "9th Annual Keystone National Exhibit." Mechanicsburg Art Center, Mechanicsburg, PA

2016 - "45th Annual Florida Watercolor Society Exhibition." Ocala FL

2017 - "Florida Watercolor Society 46th Annual Exhibition." Ft Lauderdale, FL

2017 - "Wet." Mansion at Strathmore, Rockville, MD

2017 - "Mid-Atlantic Regional Watercolor Exhibition" BlackRock Arts Center, Gaithersburg, MD

2017 - "Dreams and Recollections." Artists & Makers Studios, Rockville, MD

2018 - "Mid-Atlantic Regional Watercolor Exhibition", BlackRock Arts Center, Gaithersburg, MD

Selected collections 
Maryland Artist's Collection, University of Maryland University College

References

External links 
 Tanya Davis Website
 Torpedo Factory Artists' Association

Living people
Year of birth missing (living people)
20th-century American women artists
21st-century American women artists
Artists from Washington, D.C.
Artists from Virginia
Artists from Florida
Florida State University alumni
American watercolorists
Realist painters
Hyperrealist artists
People from Alexandria, Virginia
Painters from Virginia
Women watercolorists